La Vengeance au Triple Galop is a 2021 French comedy TV film directed by Alex Lutz and Arthur Sanigou, starring Audrey Lamy, Alex Lutz, Guillaume Gallienne, Leïla Bekhti, Gaspard Ulliel, Marion Cotillard, Izïa Higelin, and François Civil. The film is a parody of the 1983 Australian TV series Return to Eden. It was originally broadcast by French TV channel Canal+ on 4 October 2021. It was the last film starring Gaspard Ulliel to be released during his lifetime.

Plot
After the death of her father, Stephanie Harper, a wealthy heiress, finds herself at the head of an empire she never dreamed of. A few years later, she married with great fanfare Craig Danners, three weeks after their "love at first sight". This man is a star thanks to the sport of which he is a reference in the whole world. However, he is not the dream husband... Craig has an affair with Crystal, Stephanie's best friend. The couple of lovers has a Machiavellian plan to get rid of Stephanie and steal her fortune.

Cast
Audrey Lamy as Stephanie Harper / Dolly Praners
Alex Lutz as Craig Danners
Guillaume Gallienne as Claude Marquinnier
Leïla Bekhti as Crystal Clear
Gaspard Ulliel as Danley Marchal-Widkins
Marion Cotillard as Kim Randall
Izïa Higelin as Debby Harper
François Civil as Rodney Stingwing
Karin Viard as Miranda Bloomberg
Bruno Sanches as Abigail Santa Cruz
Ingrid Chauvin as La Juge

Production
A co-production between Supermouche and JMD, the film is a parody of the 1983 Australian TV series Return to Eden, whose French title is "La Vengeance aux Deux Visages" ("Two Faces of Revenge"). Director Alex Lutz said he used to watch soap-operas with his grandmother when he was a child, and that he wanted to pay a tribute to those soap-operas and also to his childhood memories.

A trailer was released on 24 September 2021.

Filming
It was filmed in three weeks between April and May 2021. It was shot in Ermenonville, on the property of horse trainer Mario Luraschi, with whom director Alex Lutz often rides.

Release
The film made its world premiere at the Rochelle Fiction Film Festival in France on 17 September 2021. It was broadcast by French TV channel Canal+ on 4 October 2021. From 20 December to 23 December 2021, the film was broadcast as a four-part miniseries on Canal+. It was also made available for streaming on Canal+'s streaming platform, myCANAL.

Awards

References

External links
 
 La Vengeance au Triple Galop at Canal+

French television films
2021 films
Canal+ films
2021 television films
2021 comedy films
French comedy films
French parody films
Films set in France
Films shot in France
2020s parody films
2020s French-language films
2020s French films